A superpower is a special or extraordinary superhuman ability that is greater than what is considered normal. Superpowers are typically displayed in science fiction comic books, television programs, video games, and films as the key attribute of a superhero. The concept originated in American comic books and pulp magazines of the 1930s and 1940s, and has gradually worked its way into other genres and media.

Definition 
There is no rigid definition of a "superpower." In popular culture, it is often associated with unusual abilities such as flight, superhuman strength and speed, invulnerability or psionics. However, it can also describe natural abilities that reach the peak of human potential, such as advanced intelligence or weapon proficiency.

Generally speaking, superheroes like Batman and Iron Man may be classified as superheroes even though they have no actual superhuman abilities beyond their exceptional talent and advanced technology. Similarly, characters with superhuman abilities derived from artificial, external sources, like Green Lantern's power ring and Tony Stark's Iron Man armor may be described as superpowers, but the wearer is not necessarily superhuman.

In fiction, superpowers are often given scientific, technological, pseudoscientific, or supernatural explanations. They come from sources such as magic, technology, or the character's own physiological nature (being an alien, a supernatural being, or a mutant).

In manga and anime
Superpowers are a commonly used concept in Comics, manga and anime, particularly in the shonen genre. They are often featured in popular manga, comics and anime such as Dragon Ball Z, Saint Seiya, YuYu Hakusho, One Piece, Black Clover, Naruto, Fullmetal Alchemist, Bleach, Code Geass, Fairy Tail, Hunter × Hunter, Attack on Titan, Spider-Man , Young avengers, Scarlet Witch, Superman, Thor, Guardians of the Galaxy (2008 team) and My Hero Academia. 

The types of powers featured vary from series to series. Some, such as Dragon Ball and Fullmetal Alchemist, feature many different characters who have the same types of powers. Others, like One Piece and Bleach, feature characters with a wide range of different powers, with many powers being unique to only one or a few characters.

References

External links 
 8 Super Powers, an online Wired Magazine article on how certain superpowers might work
 The Physics of Superheroes, by James Kakalios- a book examining how the powers of several comic book characters would work if they were real.

Fictional superhuman features or abilities
Superhero fiction themes